Sir Frederick Frank Arthur Burden (27 December 1905 – 6 July 1987) was a British Conservative politician.

Early livvvve

Burden was educated at the Sloane School, Chelsea and was British schools boxing champion 1921–22. He served with the Royal Air Force in World War II, first with a Polish unit then with Eastern Air Command, and later on the staff of Lord Louis Mountbatten at South East Asia Command, attaining the rank of Squadron Leader.

He became a company director, including of British Eagle International Airlines.

Politics

Burden contested South Shields as a National Labour candidate in 1935, and as a Conservative stood in Finsbury in 1945 and Rotherhithe in a 1946 by-election.

He was Member of Parliament (MP) for Gillingham from 1950 to 1983.  He was chairman of the Parliamentary Animal Welfare Group.
By the time of his retirement at the age of 77, he was one of the oldest sitting MPs, as well as one of the longest serving, with 33 years to his credit. James Couchman was his successor.

References 
Times Guide to the House of Commons, 1935, 1950, 1966 & 1979

External links 

1905 births
1987 deaths
Conservative Party (UK) MPs for English constituencies
Royal Air Force officers
UK MPs 1950–1951
UK MPs 1951–1955
UK MPs 1955–1959
UK MPs 1959–1964
UK MPs 1964–1966
UK MPs 1966–1970
UK MPs 1970–1974
UK MPs 1974
UK MPs 1974–1979
UK MPs 1979–1983
Royal Air Force personnel of World War II
National Labour (UK) politicians
Politicians awarded knighthoods